Bowen is an extinct town in Las Animas County, in the U.S. state of Colorado. The 1911 Colorado Business Directory describes the town as "Coal mining town and station", population 200, on the Colorado and Southern Railway. 

On 7 August 1902 an explosion of dust ignited by giant powder at the Bowen Mine killed 13 people. The precise location of the town site is unknown to the GNIS, but newspaper articles reporting the 1902 Bowen Mine Explosion place the town "about a quarter of a mile below the mine", near Trinidad.

A post office called Bowen was established in 1906, and remained in operation until 1929.  The community had the name of Thomas F. Bowen, a state legislator.

References

Ghost towns in Colorado
Geography of Las Animas County, Colorado